The Plaxton Panorama is a double decker coach bodywork, produced by Plaxton's Scarborough factory on the newly built Volvo B11RLE chassis.

The Panorama was launched in 2018, and in standard configuration seats 87 with a toilet, or 91 without.

Customers 
The majority of Panoramas purchased have to gone to Stagecoach Group operators, with the Oxford Tube ordering 34, Stagecoach's largest single order of coaches.

See also
List of buses

External links 
Brochure & Specifications

References 

Plaxton buses
Coaches (bus)